OB 318 was a North Atlantic convoy which ran during the Battle of the Atlantic in World War II. During Operation Primrose Royal Navy convoy escorts , Broadway and  captured  with an intact Enigma machine and a wealth of signals intelligence, which led to the Allied breakthrough into cracking the German naval Enigma code.

Prelude
By the spring of 1941 the battle of the Atlantic was starting to have an increase in German U-boat losses. This forced Vizeadmiral Karl Dönitz to change his strategy and he now moved his wolf packs further west, in order to catch the convoys without their anti-submarine escort. OB 318 was a west-bound convoy of 38 ships, either in ballast or carrying trade goods, and sailed from Liverpool on 2 May 1941 bound for ports in North America. The convoy commodore was R.Adm. WB MacKenzie in SS Colonial. Bockett-Pugh) and comprising ten warships; these were joined in mid-ocean by 3 EG, a force of eight warships led by HMS Bulldog (Cdr J Baker-Cresswell). Opposing them was a force of nineteen U-boats, though in the event only six were in a position to pose a threat. One of those was U-110 under the command of Kapitänleutnant Fritz-Julius Lemp.

Action
There were six U-boats within striking distance, and these were ordered to close with U-94s position.
Meanwhile, during 7 May the escort force was joined by five ships from Iceland and the destroyers of 3 EG, which were to take over escort duties from the Western Approaches to a dispersal point at 34 West, a location south of Greenland. Three ships and the destroyers of 7 EG left for Iceland during 7 May, leaving the escort force still at ten warships.

U-94
At nightfall on 7 May U-94 attacked the convoy, sinking two ships. Her skipper, Herbert Kuppisch, was able to enter the convoy by submerging ahead of the convoy and letting the lead escorts pass. he was then able to fire at close range on the ships in the centre of the convoy, hitting Ixion and Eastern Star. U-94 was damaged and forced to retire, though she was able to effect repairs later and continue her patrol.

On 8 May the remaining vessels of 3 EG, three corvettes and two trawlers, with the armed merchant cruiser Ranpura in company, joined the convoy, and the remaining ships of 7 EG departed.

U-110
On the evening of 8 May U-110 and  also made contact, tracking the convoy until morning. In an unusual move, the two skippers made rendezvous in order to co-ordinate their attack; Lemp in U-110 would make a submerged attack from ahead, while Adalbert Schnee in U-201 would do the same from the rear. It was expected that the escort would have departed by this time, leaving the convoy vulnerable to their assault.  During the morning of 9 May U-110 moved into position and commenced her attack. Lemp was surprised to encounter the escort still in place, but succeeded in penetrating the convoy, sinking two ships. Lemp was targeting a tanker with his fourth torpedo tube when Aubrietia spotted the periscope and then located U-110 with ASDIC.  Aubrietia gave the alert to other ships while she unloaded and dropped a pattern of depth charges. U-110 performed a deep dive and managed to survive the initial onslaught. Aubrietia was joined by the destroyers Bulldog and Broadway, and the attack was delivered with such force that Lemp was forced to surface. As he came up a dozen men on U-110 rushed to man the guns but were shot by the waiting British ships. Lemp also saw that Bulldog was preparing to ram so Lemp gave the hurried order to abandon ship. Commander Joe Baker-Cresswell decided to try to capture the U-boat instead and hove to. The survivors went over the side including Lemp. It turned out that Lemp realising that Bulldog was not going to ram had decided to go back and try to destroy the equipment along with the code books but he failed and died in the attempt. U-110 itself survived the attack, but was seriously damaged and was taking on water.

Bulldog soon had pulled alongside and Sub-Lieutenant David Balme led a boarding party, and began stripping her of what they could find. Balme's team soon began to take off the valuables, and these turned out to be codebooks, charts, ciphers and most significantly, a complete and undamaged Enigma machine. The crew hadn't any idea what it was they had captured. Before they transferred the equipment Bulldog had to depart, leaving the U-boat with the prize crew as it had received a message of another submarine in the area. Balme and his men were left on board U-110 for over an hour before Bulldog returned.

U-201
Meanwhile, Schnee in U-201 made his attack, sinking one ship and damaging another. He was also counter-attacked, by Amazon, Nigella and St Apollo, and forced to retire. He was left damaged.

U-556
As OB 318 was at its dispersal point, the convoy separated during the night, while the escorts departed to meet their next charge. However U-556 was able to keep in touch with a group of ships heading south-west, and during the day sank two more.

Aftermath and significance
U-boats sank five ships from convoy OB 318; and three, including the convoy commodore's ship Colonial, were sunk before arriving by U-boats patrolling near their destinations. Thirty-three ships arrived safely at their destinations over the next two weeks.

Baker-Cresswell took U-110 in tow, but she sank within hours due to the damage she had sustained. Lemp was lost with 14 members of his crew, but a war correspondent, 4 officers and 28 men were rescued and sent to Scapa Flow as prisoners of war. At Scapa Flow experts from Bletchley Park were waiting and were exceptionally surprised with what they collected and took back with them.
The capture of the Enigma machine was highly secret at the time, and none of the crew knew of the significance. The machine itself significantly assisted the work in hand at Bletchley Park in breaking German naval codes. This was the first fully functioning machine and the first one used to break the naval codes along with the capture of codes from a number of German weather ships during the same year. Thanks to this Enigma machine,  Bletchley were able to inform the Royal Navy and thus steered convoys away from where most groups of U-boat packs were present. The difference made was substantial; from when the information began to pour through in June 1941 Allied shipping losses were around 432,000 tons, but by August it had dropped to less than 80,000 tons.

Thereafter it was solved using cryptanalysis led by Alan Turing for over three years. Some 1,400 signals were read during that period. Baker-Cresswell was awarded the DSO and promoted captain. King George VI told him the capture of the U-110 cipher material had been "the most important single event in the whole war at sea".

Tables

Allied merchant ships

Convoy Escorts

U-boats Hit

U-571 (film)

The film U-571 was partially inspired by the capture of U-110. The film however caused irritation and anger in Britain whereby the film's plot was Americanised. The anger came to such a point that at Prime Minister's Questions, Tony Blair agreed with questioner Brian Jenkins MP that the film was "an affront" to British sailors.
In response to a letter from Paul Truswell, MP for the Pudsey constituency (which includes Horsforth, a town proud of its connection with HMS Aubrietia), U.S. president Bill Clinton wrote assuring that the film's plot was only a work of fiction.
Despite the criticisms however David Balme was interviewed by the director of the film, Jonathan Mostow in which he described the capture of U-110 and the capture itself was mentioned at the start of the end credits as recognition and response to the criticisms.

See also
 Ultra
 Cryptanalysis of the Enigma
 Kurzsignale

Notes

Sources
 Balme, David. OPERATION PRIMROSE: The Story of the Capture of the Enigma Cypher Machine from U11O Military History Journal Vol 9 No 3 - June 1993- The South African Military History Society
 Blair, Clay Hitler's U-Boat War The Hunters 1939-1942 (1996) Random House 
 Hague, Arnold : The Allied Convoy System 1939–1945 (2000).  ISBN (Canada) 1 55125 033 0 .   ISBN (UK) 1 86176 147 3
 Kemp, Paul  : U-Boats Destroyed  ( 1997). 
 Lenton, H.T. & Colledge, J.J. British and Dominion Warships of World War II Doubleday and Company (1968)
 Neistle, Axel  : German U-Boat Losses during World War II  (1998). 
 Roskill, Stephen. The Secret Capture: U-110 and the Enigma Story. Naval Institute Press, 
 Roskill, Stephen : The War at Sea 1939–1945  Vol I  (1954).  ISBN (none)
 Sebag-Montefiore, Hugh. Enigma: The Battle for the Code W&N; First Edition, 2000. 
 van der Vat, Dan : The Atlantic Campaign (1988).

External links
 OB 318 at convoyweb
 OB 318 at uboatnet

Conflicts in 1941
Enigma machine
C
Naval battles of World War II involving Germany
OB318